Sonny Jay Muharrem (born 30 June 1993) is an English radio presenter and singer. In 2021, he won the thirteenth series of Dancing on Ice. From January 3, 2023, he will host "The Capital Late Show" on Capital, taking over from Marvin Humes.

Career
As a musician he was known for being a member of the group Loveable Rogues who reached the finals of the sixth series of Britain's Got Talent in 2012. As a radio presenter he presented Phoenix FM from 2015 to 2017 before moving to Capital FM. He began presenting Capital Breakfast alongside Roman Kemp and Vick Hope (later Sian Welby), on December 15, 2022, Sonny announced he would be leaving Capital Breakfast on December 16, 2022 to take over Marvin Humes' slot on The Capital Late Show every Monday to Thursday on January 3, 2023. In 2021, he won the thirteenth series of Dancing on Ice partnered with Angela Egan.

Jay discussed his Dancing on Ice triumph when he was a celebrity contestant on The Chase which aired on 12 December 2021 (series 11, episode 10).

Personal life
Muharrem became engaged to his girlfriend Lauren Faith in August 2020. They later got divorced in 2022.

Discography

References

External links 
 

1993 births
Living people
Britain's Got Talent contestants
Capital (radio network)
English radio DJs